Aquatic Park may refer to:

Aquatic Park (Berkeley) in Berkeley, California, United States
Aquatic Park Historic District in San Francisco, California, United States
Aquatic Park (Toronto) in Toronto, Canada